Walther Binner (28 January 1891 – 18 September 1971) was a German freestyle swimmer who competed in the 1912 Summer Olympics. He was born in Breslau and died in Frankfurt am Main.

In 1912 he was eliminated in the first round of the 100 metre freestyle event. He was the president of swimming's world governing body, FINA from 1932 to 1936, and was also a member of the International Olympic Committee.

References

External links

1891 births
1971 deaths
Sportspeople from Wrocław
German male swimmers
German male freestyle swimmers
Olympic swimmers of Germany
Swimmers at the 1912 Summer Olympics
Presidents of FINA
International Olympic Committee members